Giambattista Giannoccaro (born 22 October 1960 in Fasano, Italy) is an Italian racing driver and entrepreneur. He owns his own racing team, Scuderia Playteam, which he has competed for.

He is an Italian GT Champion and Spanish GT Champion. He also competed in the FIA GT Championship in the 2007 season with his own team. He finished first in the GT2 Class in the 2006 Mil Milhas.

He tested for his own team for A.C. Milan in the 2008 Superleague Formula season.
He won the Spanish GT Championship in 2006 with the Ferrari 360 GTC and the Italian GT Championship with the Maserati MC12 pairing with the Finnish car mate Tony Vilander.

References

Italian racing drivers
1960 births
Living people
FIA GT Championship drivers
Sportspeople from the Province of Brindisi
24 Hours of Spa drivers